Julien Lamy (born 6 November 1999) is a French professional footballer who plays as a winger for Cypriot Second Division side Enosis Neon Paralimni.

Having started his career in his native France with Brest II and Plabennec, Lamy has since played in England with Rotherham United, AFC Wimbledon and Grimsby Town.

Career
Born in Paris, Lamy started his career in his native France with Brest II, signing for Plabennec in July 2017. He was released by Plabennec at the end of the 2017–18 season. During the 2018–19 season he had trials with English clubs West Bromwich Albion and Nottingham Forest. After also trialling with Rotherham United, he signed a one-year contract with the club in June 2019.

He made his senior debut on 8 October 2019, in the EFL Trophy. In January 2020 manager Paul Warne said Lamy had to impress whilst playing for the reserves if he wanted more first-team appearances.

On 31 January 2020, Lamy joined AFC Wimbledon on loan for the rest of the 2019–20 season.

He was released by Rotherham at the end of the 2019–20 season.

He signed for Grimsby Town on 5 February 2021, following a trial. On 12 May 2021 it was announced that he would leave Grimsby at the end of the season, following the expiry of his contract.

For the 2021–22 season, Lamy signed for Cypriot Second Division side Enosis Neon Paralimni.

References

1999 births
Living people
French footballers
Stade Brestois 29 players
Stade Plabennécois players
Rotherham United F.C. players
AFC Wimbledon players
Grimsby Town F.C. players
Enosis Neon Paralimni FC players
Association football wingers
French expatriate footballers
French expatriates in England
Expatriate footballers in England
English Football League players
French expatriates in Cyprus
Expatriate footballers in Cyprus